Shadow Blade is a fast-paced ninja platforming game for iOS, Android and Ouya, from developer Dead Mage. It features intuitive touch controls and an array of weapons and challenging levels. There is also a PC version of this game called Shadow Blade: Reload that is enhanced for PC and PlayStation 4 gamers, with a level editor and more levels.

Gameplay 

The game consists of bite-sized levels and rewards the player based on three factors: the total time to traverse the level from start to the end, the number of orbs collected across the level and the number of hidden objects found.

The main challenges revolve around precision platforming, combat and stealth play.

Story 
Kuro is a young man on his quest to become the Shadow Blade. He must seek the teachings of the last remaining ninja master. You will guide him through challenging levels, around countless traps, sneaking past enemies or right over their dead bodies. You have to be fast, be stealthy, be aware of your environment. You have to be a ninja.

Development

Reception 

Shadow Blade's reception has been almost universally positive, with the lowest score currently being 70 out of 100 on Metacritic. As of this writing, Shadow Blade holds an aggregate score of 81 (again, out of 100.) Shadow Blade also made AppStore's Editor's Choice in the week of its release.

VideoGamer gives Shadow Blade 9 out of 10, saying: Easily one of the better mobile games in recent memory, Shadowblade is a shining beacon and a stinging lesson to other developers. This is the bar. Now you try and raise it.

An example portion of a review, from Littlehampton Gazette, includes: Shadow Blade plays like a new ninja graduate slashing and spinning out of the blocks, intent on redefining your impression of the very best action platformers gone before. Drawing on the ying[sic] and disposing of the yang from similar games gone by, it slices through any new year gaming apathy you may still be harbouring to deliver a visceral, if depressingly brief, digital distraction. It controls like a dream, offers obvious style and panache through its martial arts execution, and is all underpinned by glorious level design that keeps the blood pumping through your palms as you try to dispatch every enemy on screen and reach your goal. There’s drama, great design and drool-worthy danger at the end of every digit swipe - just cut to the chase and download this razor-sharp slice ‘em up.

Some critics have praised the game's touch controls; 148Apps writes: Shadow Blade is a stylish trial platformer that's hard to put down thanks in large part to its intuitive touchscreen controls.

References

External links 
Official Website
Shadow Blade Facebook Page
Official Dead Mage Website
Dead Mage on Twitter
Shadow Blade on AppStore

2014 video games
Android (operating system) games
Crescent Moon Games games
IOS games
Japan in non-Japanese culture
Mobile software
Ouya games
Single-player video games
Video games about ninja
Video games developed in Iran
Dead Mage games